Time in Burkina Faso is given by a single time zone, denoted as Greenwich Mean Time (GMT; UTC±00:00). Burkina Faso shares this time zone with several other countries, including fourteen in western Africa. Burkina Faso does not observe daylight saving time (DST).

IANA time zone database 
In the IANA time zone database, Burkina Faso is given one zone in the file zone.tab—Africa/Ouagadougou. "BF" refers to the country's ISO 3166-1 alpha-2 country code. Data for Burkina Faso directly from zone.tab of the IANA time zone database; columns marked with * are the columns from zone.tab itself:

See also 
Time in Africa
List of time zones by country

References

External links 
Current time in Burkina Faso at Time.is
Time in Burkina Faso at TimeAndDate.com

Time in Burkina Faso